Abdallah Ndour (born 20 December 1993) is a Senegalese professional footballer who plays for Sochaux as a left-back.

Career
In June 2020, Ndour signed for FC Sochaux-Montbéliard on a three-year contract, joining from Strasbourg.

References

External links
 

1993 births
Living people
Senegalese footballers
Senegalese expatriate footballers
Association football defenders
Ligue 2 players
Championnat National players
Génération Foot players
FC Metz players
RC Strasbourg Alsace players
FC Sochaux-Montbéliard players
Senegalese expatriate sportspeople in France
Expatriate footballers in France